Solidarity action (also known as secondary action, a secondary boycott, a solidarity strike, or a sympathy strike) is industrial action by a trade union in support of a strike initiated by workers in a separate corporation, but often the same enterprise, group of companies, or connected firm.

In Australia, Latvia, Luxembourg, the Netherlands, the United States, and the United Kingdom, solidarity action is illegal, and strikes can only be against the contractual employer. Germany, Italy and Spain have restrictions in place that restrict the circumstances in which solidarity action can take place (see European labour law).

The term "secondary action" is often used with the intention of distinguishing different types of trade dispute with a worker's direct contractual employer. Thus, a secondary action is a dispute with the employer's parent company, its suppliers, financiers, contracting parties, or any other employer in another industry.

Australia 

In Australia, secondary boycotts are prohibited by the Competition and Consumer Act 2010. In the 1910s, sympathy strikes were sometimes called to extend a strike beyond the bounds of an Australian state to make it eligible for handling by the federal arbitration court.

United Kingdom 

In the United Kingdom, sympathy strikes were outlawed by the Trade Disputes and Trade Unions Act 1927 in the aftermath of the general strike. That was repealed by the Trade Disputes and Trade Unions Act 1946, passed by the postwar Labour Government.

Solidarity action remained legal until 1980, when the government of Margaret Thatcher passed the Employment Act 1980 to restrict it. That was followed by the Employment Act 1990, which outlawed solidarity action entirely. The laws outlawing solidarity strikes remain to this day.

In 2005, union leaders called for the legalization of solidarity strikes in the aftermath of the strike action against the catering company Gate Gourmet, but Labour ministers stated that they had no intention of repealing the law. British Airways staff walked out in solidarity, however.

United States 

Because farm laborers in the United States are not covered by the Wagner Act, the United Farm Workers union has legally used solidarity boycotting of grocery store chains to aid to its strikes against California agribusiness and its primary boycotts of California grapes, lettuce and wine. Its secondary boycotts involved asking consumers to stop shopping at a grocery store chain until the chain stopped carrying the boycotted grapes, lettuce, or wine.

Secondary boycotting is frequently confused with secondary striking, also a prohibited tactic for labour unions covered by the Taft–Hartley Act. Some legal definitions for secondary boycotting divide it into two different kinds: secondary consumer boycotts according to the above definition of secondary boycotts, and secondary employee boycotts, also defined as a secondary strike.

See also 

 Boycott, for the related consumer concept
 Longshoremen v. Allied Int'l, Inc.

Notes

References
M Kite and T Freinberg, 'Unions to Challenge Blair Over Ban on Secondary Strikes' (Daily Telegraph, 27 August 2005).

Community organizing
Protest tactics
Labor disputes